The 1970 Macdonald Brier, Canada's national men's curling championship was held March 2–6 at the Winnipeg Arena in Winnipeg, Manitoba.

The hometown Don Duguid rink out of Winnipeg's Granite Club won the event in the last draw, when they beat Saskatchewan's Bob Pickering rink in front of 9,287 fans at the Winnipeg Arena, which was "filled to capacity". This gave the team the best round robin record, preventing a playoff against the next best team, Alberta which had one more loss. With the championship, the Duguid team would go on to represent Canada at the 1970 Air Canada Silver Broom, the World Curling Championships, which they won. 

Duguid's only loss came against team British Columbia, skipped by 1964 Brier champion Lyall Dagg, who would go on to finish in third place. Manitoba's first round match against Alberta, skipped by 1961 Brier and World Champion Hec Gervais proved to be the deciding game. The ice in that game as particularly bad, as it had "almost turned to water", making players have to throw the rocks very hard to get them to the other end, and making hits nearly impossible. Manitoba won their match against Alberta 10-9, after Gervais missed his last throw.

Prior to the season, Duguid's experience as a skip was limited, though he had won the 1965 Brier as a third. For the 1970 season, Duguid reluctantly joined forces with teammates Rod Hunter, Jim Pettapiece and Bryan Wood, replacing Hunter's brother, and found immediate success.

Teams
The teams are listed as follows:

Round Robin standings

Round Robin results

Draw 1 
Monday, March 2

Draw 2 
Monday, March 2

Draw 3 
Tuesday, March 3

Draw 4 
Tuesday, March 3

Draw 5 
Wednesday, March 4

Draw 6 
Wednesday, March 4

Draw 7 
Thursday, March 5

Draw 8 
Thursday, March 5

Draw 9 
Thursday, March 5

Draw 10 
Friday, March 6

Draw 11 
Friday, March 6

Awards

All-Star Team 
The media selected the following curlers as All-Stars. 

Ross G.L. Harstone Award
The Ross Harstone Award was presented to the player chosen by their fellow peers as the curler who best represented Harstone's high ideals of good sportsmanship, observance of the rules, exemplary conduct and curling ability.

References

2019 Brier Media Guide: Brier Personnel 1927-2018
Results at Soudog Curling

1970
Curling competitions in Winnipeg
1970 in Manitoba
March 1970 sports events in Canada
1970 in Canadian curling
1970s in Winnipeg